The men's shot put event at the 2015 European Athletics Indoor Championships was held on 5 March 2015 at 16:30 (qualification) and 6 March, 17:25 (final) local time.

Medalists

Records

Results

Qualification 
Qualification: Qualification Performance 20.55 (Q) or at least 8 best performers advanced to the final.

Final

References 

2015 European Athletics Indoor Championships
Shot put at the European Athletics Indoor Championships